Finnish People's Democratic League (SKDL; , DFFF) was a Finnish political organisation with the aim of uniting those left of the Finnish Social Democratic Party. It was founded in 1944 as the anti-communist laws in Finland were repealed due to the demands of the Soviet Union, and lasted until 1990, when it merged into the newly formed Left Alliance. At its time, SKDL was one of the largest leftist parties in capitalist Europe, with its main member party, the Communist Party of Finland, being one of the largest communist parties west of the Iron Curtain. The SKDL enjoyed its greatest electoral success in the 1958 parliamentary election, when it gained a support of approximately 23 per cent and a representation of 50 MPs of 200 total, making it the largest party in the Eduskunta.

SKDL joined several Finnish governments. The first SKDL minister was Yrjö Leino who took office in November 1944. After the 1945 parliamentary election SKDL was a major player in the Paasikivi III coalition with social democrats and parties of the centre, and in 1946 SKDL's Mauno Pekkala became the prime minister. The Pekkala government led the state until summer 1948, after which the SKDL didn't participate in any coalitions until 1966. The late 1960s governments, led by social democrats and including centre, were called popular front by the SKDL. The party left the government in spring 1971 but returned in 1975. Kalevi Sorsa's third coalition was the last one SKDL was in, until December 1982.

Organisation
During most of its existence the SKDL had over 50 000 "own" members. In addition to the community members, tens of different nationwide organizations were controlled by the SKDL members, see for example the People's Temperance League.

The supporters of the SKP constantly had a majority in the SKDL, thus it was regarded by many as a communist front. The SKP members often attended two consecutive meetings to decide on the same issues. However, not even socialism was mentioned in the party programme until the late 1960s. The number of communist party members amongst the SKDL MPs constantly increased from 1945 on, even though many prominent left-wing socialists and former social democrats had joined the alliance in the 1940s.

One of the few organized non-SKP forces in SKDL was the Socialist Unity Party (SYP) which was founded mainly by former social democrats in 1946. The small and marginalized SYP left the SKDL in 1955 but most of the socialists inside the SKDL chose not to follow the decision made by the party chair Atos Wirtanen and they remained members of the SKDL through its basic organisations. In the early 1970s a Joint Committee of the SKDL Socialists was formed but it never developed an organisation and remained a loose coalition.

Publications
 was SKDL's party organ from 1944 until 1956. SKDL also published many regional daily newspapers. In 1957 Vapaa Sana was merged with the SKP organ  to launch Kansan Uutiset, which was the organ of both parties until 1990. Kansan Uutiset still appears and since 2000 it has been the organ of Left Alliance.

Leaders

Electoral results

Parliamentary elections

Local elections

Presidential elections

None of the party's own candidates were elected President, although Urho Kekkonen was elected both times when SKDL seconded him.

See also
Kaisu-Mirjami Rydberg
Communist Party of Finland

 
Political parties established in 1944
Defunct political parties in Finland
Socialist parties in Finland
Political parties disestablished in 1990
1944 establishments in Finland
1990 disestablishments in Finland